The men's 100 metres event at the 1986 Commonwealth Games was held on 26 and 27 July at the Meadowbank Stadium in Edinburgh.

Medalists

Results

Heats
Qualification: First 4 of each heat (Q) and the next 4 fastest (q) qualified for the semifinals.

Wind:Heat 1: +2.0 m/s, Heat 2: +3.0 m/s, Heat 3: +2.5 m/s

Semifinals
Qualification: First 4 of each semifinal qualified directly (Q) for the final.

Wind:Heat 1: -1.5 m/s, Heat 2: +3.2 m/s

Final
Wind: +1.6 m/s

References

Athletics at the 1986 Commonwealth Games
1986